Čičmany is a village and municipality in Žilina District in the Žilina Region of northern Slovakia. It contains a folk architecture reserve, which was founded in 1977.

Etymology
The name is derived from a Slovak word čičman (a lumberjack who makes a noise while working).

History
The first preserved reference to the village dates from 1272 (Cziczman). After a great fire in 1921, the village was restored to its original appearance with generous contributions by the state. Until the mid-20th century, the village was a centre of sheep raising.

Geography
It has a population of about 204 people.

Culture
Timbered houses with ridge roofs, galleries and pointed or linear wall decorations have been preserved in Čičmany. Of particular interest are the very specific white patterns which are painted on the exterior walls of the houses to decorate them. The local folk music, special folk costumes and folk dances of the village have been preserved as well.

Genealogical resources

The records for genealogical research are available at the state archive "Statny Archiv in Bytca, Slovakia"

 Roman Catholic church records (births/marriages/deaths): 1729–1918 (parish A)

See also
 List of municipalities and towns in Slovakia

References

External links

 http://www.cicmany.info
 http://www.cicmany.viapvt.sk/
 http://www.peacegallery.com/europe/slovakia/slovakia11.htm
 http://www.mestozilina.sk/sprievodca/mesto/okolie/cicmany.html
Surnames of living people in Čičmany

Villages and municipalities in Žilina District